Atonye Nyingifa (born 8 December 1990) is a Nigerian-American basketball player for Porta XI Ensino and the Nigerian national team.

She participated at the 2017 Women's Afrobasket.

References

External links

1990 births
Living people
Basketball players at the 2020 Summer Olympics
American expatriate basketball people in Israel
Nigerian expatriate basketball people in Israel
Nigerian expatriate basketball people in Spain
American expatriate basketball people in Spain
Nigerian women's basketball players
Olympic basketball players of Nigeria
Power forwards (basketball)
UCLA Bruins women's basketball players
American women's basketball players
Citizens of Nigeria through descent
African-American basketball players
Nigerian people of African-American descent
Sportspeople from Torrance, California
American sportspeople of Nigerian descent
21st-century African-American sportspeople
Basketball players from Los Angeles
Nigerian expatriate basketball people in Turkey
American expatriate basketball people in Turkey